"What I Really Meant to Say" is a debut song written by Cyndi Thomson, Tommy Lee James and Chris Waters.  It was released in March 2001 as Thomson's debut single, as well as the lead-off single from her debut album My World. The song reached the top of the Hot Country Singles & Tracks (now Hot Country Songs) chart, giving Thomson her only Number One single on that chart. It also made her the third country music artist that year to reach Number One with a debut single.

Content
The song is a mid-tempo mostly accompanied by acoustic guitar and mandolin, with cello and penny whistle runs. The narrator is a female who runs into a former lover, and he asks her how she is. She tells him that she is "just fine", and then tells him that she really meant to say that she was still in love with him.

In the second verse, the male lover walks away from the female, and she is hurt. She tries to fight back tears, as she watches her lover.

Music video
The music video was directed by Brent Hedgecock and premiered in early 2001.

Critical reception
Thom Jurek of Allmusic gave the song a favorable review. He stated that "the single is clearly meant to put the album in hands and minds of country music radio station programmers.

Chart performance
"What I Really Meant to Say" debuted at number 53 on the U.S. Billboard Hot Country Singles & Tracks for the week of March 31, 2001. This song also was part of the Billboard's top 100 country songs of the 2000s, coming in at number 87.

Year-end charts

References

2001 debut singles
2001 songs
Cyndi Thomson songs
Songs written by Tommy Lee James
Songs written by Chris Waters
Songs written by Cyndi Thomson
Song recordings produced by Paul Worley
Capitol Records Nashville singles